Dover-Foxcroft is the largest town in and the seat of Piscataquis County, Maine, United States. The population was 4,422 at the 2020 census. The town is located near the geographic center of the state.

History

Dover-Foxcroft was originally two towns, Dover and Foxcroft, separated by the Piscataquis River. Dover was to the south of the river, and Foxcroft was to the north.

Dover was purchased from Massachusetts by Boston merchants Charles Vaughan and John Merrick, both of whom had emigrated from England. It was first permanently settled in 1803 by Eli Towne from Temple, New Hampshire, then incorporated on January 19, 1822. Agriculture was the principal early occupation, producing potatoes, corn and grain.

Originally known as T5 R7 NWP, Foxcroft was one of five towns conveyed by Massachusetts in 1796 to Bowdoin College. It was purchased from the college in 1800 by Joseph E. Foxcroft of New Gloucester and settled by John, Eleazer and Seth Spaulding in 1806, when they built the first mill. It was dubbed Spauldingtown until February 29, 1812, when it was incorporated as Foxcroft, taking its proprietor's name.

The Piscataquis River offered water power sites for mills. In 1859 the population of Dover was 2,500 and industries included four sawmills, shingle and clapboard manufacturers, one gristmill, two tanneries, two carriage makers, and a woolen factory.

By 1859, the population of Foxcroft was 1,045, industries included two sawmills, one shingle mill, one carding machine, one carriage builder, one chair manufacturer, one tannery, one fork maker, two pail makers, one machinist, and a sash, door and blind factory.
In 1866 the Hughes & Son Piano Mfg. Co. was established and ran until closed in 1921. (source: Pierce Piano Atlas 11th ed. )
On March 1, 1922, the two towns merged into a single town.

Dover-Foxcroft has a notable United States post office mural painted during the New Deal era. 

The American Woolen Company Foxcroft Mill is a historic district of industrial buildings added to the National Register of Historic Places in December 2012. It contains buildings built between 1841 and 1944.

Dover-Foxcroft is home to the Maine Whoopie Pie Festival, an annual one-day event which takes place in late June each year. It started in 2009 to honor the whoopie pie. The whoopie pie became the official state treat of Maine in 2013. The 2012 festival brought 5,000 people to the town while the 2014 event brought in more than 7,500 attendees.

Geography

Dover-Foxcroft is drained by the Piscataquis River.

The town is crossed by state routes 6, 7, 15, 16 and 153. It is the commercial center of the county.

Climate

This climatic region is typified by large seasonal temperature differences, with warm to hot (and often humid) summers and cold (sometimes severely cold) winters.  According to the Köppen Climate Classification system, Dover-Foxcroft has a humid continental climate, abbreviated "Dfb" on climate maps.

Demographics

2010 census

As of the census of 2010, there were 4,213 people, 1,773 households, and 1,120 families residing in the town. The racial makeup of the town was 95.1% White, 0.2% African American, 0.6% Native American, 2.3% Asian, 0.3% from other races, and 1.5% from two or more races. Hispanic or Latino of any race were 1.4% of the population.

There were 1,773 households, of which 26.5% had children under the age of 18 living with them, 48.8% were married couples living together, 10.0% had a female householder with no husband present, 4.3% had a male householder with no wife present, and 36.8% were non-families. 30.6% of all households were made up of individuals, and 14.5% had someone living alone who was 65 years of age or older. The average household size was 2.27 and the average family size was 2.79.

The median age in the town was 45 years. 21.5% of residents were under the age of 18; 6.4% were between the ages of 18 and 24; 22.1% were from 25 to 44; 29.8% were from 45 to 64; and 20.2% were 65 years of age or older. The gender makeup of the town was 48.1% male and 51.9% female.

2000 census

As of the census of 2000, there were 4,211 people, 1,658 households, and 1,152 families residing in the town. The racial makeup of the town was 96.91% Caucasian, 0.21% Black or African American, 0.52% Native American, 0.52% Asian, 0.02% Pacific Islander, 0.19% from other races and 1.61% from two or more races. Hispanic or Latino of any race were 0.95% of the population.

There were 1,658 households, out of which 32.4% had children under the age of 18 living with them, 54.6% were married couples living together, 10.3% had a female householder with no husband present, and 30.5% were non-families. 25.4% of all households were made up of individuals, and 11.8% had someone living alone who was 65 years of age or older. The average household size was 2.45 and the average family size was 2.91.

In the town, the population was spread out, with 36.9% under the age of 18, 5.8% from 18 to 24, 25.7% from 25 to 44, 25.7% from 45 to 64, and 17.8% who were 65 years of age or older. The median age was 41 years. For every 100 females, there were 93.2 males. For every 100 females age 18 and over, there were 90.6 males.

The median income for a household in the town was $30,164, and the median income for a family was $36,287. Males had a median income of $30,000 versus $20,613 for females. The per capita income for the town was $14,544. About 13.6% of families and 15.8% of the population were below the poverty line, including 21.3% of those under age 18 and 8.8% of those age 65 or over.

Education

Dover-Foxcroft is a part of Regional School Unit 68 (RSU68).

RSU 68 provides primary schooling for the town and several surrounding communities at three schools in Dover-Foxcroft: SeDoMoCha Elementary School provides for Pre-K–4th grades and SeDoMoCha Middle School (named for four of the communities that attend: Sebec, Dover-Foxcroft, Monson and Charleston) provides for grades 5–8.

Foxcroft Academy is a private secondary school that accepts all students from MSAD68 as well as others from across the state. They also have an international program and have 2 dormitories and several boarding houses in town.

Notable people

 Corey Beaulieu, lead guitarist for the metal band Trivium
 Clarence Blethen, baseball pitcher
 Mary Mitchell Birchall, first woman to graduate from a New England college
 Alfred Eliab Buck, U.S. Representative from Alabama
 Stephen Decatur Carpenter, military officer
 Rob Derhak, bass player and vocalist for the jam rock band Moe
 Lisa Rowe Fraustino, children's author
 Frank E. Guernsey, U.S. Representative from Maine
 Hannah Hanson Kinney, alleged serial killer
 Laurie G. Lachance, president of Thomas College
 Henry Otis Pratt, minister and U.S. Representative from Iowa
 Nathaniel S. Robinson, Wisconsin legislator and physician
 Ninetta May Runnals (1885–1980), Dean of Women at Colby College
 Dave Schwep, director and photographer
 Douglas Smith, state legislator
 Lillian M. N. Stevens, temperance worker
 Henry M. Thompson, Wisconsin legislator and businessperson
 Amasa Tracy, military officer
 Leroy M. Washburn, Wisconsin legislator

References

External links

 Town of Dover-Foxcroft, Maine
 Dover-Foxcroft Historical Society & Museum

 
County seats in Maine
1922 establishments in Maine